Pieter van Vollenhoven Jr. (born April 30, 1939) is the husband of Princess Margriet of the Netherlands and a member, by marriage, of the Dutch royal house.

Early life and career
Van Vollenhoven was born in Schiedam, he is the second son of Pieter van Vollenhoven Sr. (1897–1977) and his wife Jacoba Gijsbertha Stuylingh de Lange (1906–1983). The van Vollenhoven family and the Stuylingh de Lange family belong to the Dutch patriciate.

Van Vollenhoven attended secondary school in Rotterdam, and he subsequently studied law at the University of Leiden. He graduated in 1965, after which he worked as a legal officer for the Netherlands Council of State. In 1966, he performed his military service with the Royal Netherlands Air Force, and attained a military pilot license the following year.

Current positions
Van Vollenhoven is currently most well known in The Netherlands for having been the chairman of the Dutch Safety Board from which he retired in February 2011. He was originally appointed chairman of the Road Transportation Safety Board and the Rail Incident Board by minister Tjerk Westerterp. Following the Bijlmer and Hercules disasters, a need was felt in The Netherlands for a single body to investigate all transportation-related incidents; the Transportation Safety Council (Dutch: Raad voor de Transportveiligheid) was created, which incorporated the earlier Road Transportation Safety and Rail Incident Boards and also had Van Vollenhoven as chairman. Van Vollenhoven felt, however, that the country should have a single board to investigate all safety-related issues; lobbying on his part finally convinced the government to transform the Transportation Safety Council into a general Safety Board, of which Van Vollenhoven was made the first chairman.

Due to his expertise in the area, the University of Twente made Van Vollenhoven a professor on October 1, 2005. He holds the policy research chair, which is a subspecialty of the risk management group. He held his oration on April 28, 2006 and called for the creation of a Minister of Safety at that time.

In 1989, Van Vollenhoven took the initiative in setting up the Dutch Victim Support Fund, of which he is also the chairman. He is also chairman of the Nationaal Groenfonds, the National Restorationfund and the Society, Safety and Police Association and the International Transport Safety Board. He is a member of the European Transport Safety Council.

Notable acts
As Chairman of the Safety Board, Van Vollenhoven oversaw the investigation of the Schipholbrand, a fire in a holding facility for illegal immigrants in The Netherlands. He presented a final report on September 21, 2006 with such devastating findings that ministers Piet Hein Donner and Sybilla Dekker resigned over it. A third responsible minister, Rita Verdonk refused to resign despite her responsibility in the matter.

Following the Turkish Airlines Flight 1951 crash, Van Vollenhoven led the investigation by the Safety Board. This investigation brought him into conflict with the Office of the Attorney General, which requested access to the black box data. Citing that there was no reason at that time to suspect foul play and that the Board investigation would be hampered by the threat of legal action against persons, Van Vollenhoven absolutely refused this access.

When he turned 70, Barry Sweedler (of the US National Transportation Safety Board) said to him: "The world is a safer place because of your work and leadership".

Hobbies
Van Vollenhoven is an avid pianist. In 1986 he formed a trio – De Gevleugelde Vrienden – with two of the country's leading pianists (Pim Jacobs and Louis van Dijk) and gave some twenty concerts a year both at home and abroad in aid of the Victim Support Fund. De Gevleugelde Vrienden were awarded four gold discs. Since the death of one of the members of the trio, Pim Jacobs, Van Vollenhoven has continued to give concerts with pianists Louis van Dijk and Koos Mark.

Van Vollenhoven is still an active pilot and he also dives. He almost lost the tip of his right index finger during a dive in 2005, when he got caught between the boat and the dock steps. Doctors were able to reattach the tip.

He is also a photographer. The Victim Support Fund raised money in 2008 and 2009 by selling calendars with his photographs.

Health

Van Vollenhoven was diagnosed with a Melanoma, a common type of skin cancer, in May 2017. He had it removed at the Netherlands Cancer Institute in Amsterdam. In November that same year, he was diagnosed with another Melanoma and had it removed.

Marriage and family

Van Vollenhoven married Princess Margriet of the Netherlands at The Hague on January 10, 1967, in the St. James Church. This made him the first member of the Dutch Royal House being a commoner and not of royal or noble origin. He was not given any royal titles as a result of the marriage and is therefore formally addressed as "Mister Van Vollenhoven" or by his professional title as "Professor Van Vollenhoven".

The couple went to live in Het Loo House, near the Het Loo Palace. They have four sons:
Prince Maurits of Orange-Nassau, van Vollenhoven (born April 17, 1968), married Marilène van den Broek (born February 4, 1970);
Prince Bernhard of Orange-Nassau, van Vollenhoven (born December 25, 1969), married Annette Sekrève (born April 18, 1972);
Prince Pieter-Christiaan of Orange-Nassau, van Vollenhoven (born March 22, 1972), married Anita van Eijk (born October 27, 1969);
Prince Floris of Orange-Nassau, van Vollenhoven (born April 10, 1975), married Aimée Söhngen (born October 19, 1977).

The German house name Lippe-Biesterfeld is borne by the children of Prince Maurits (making them Van Lippe-Biesterfeld van Vollenhoven); his other (grand)children are just van Vollenhoven.

Honours and awards

Van Vollenhoven received numerous honours and awards in the Netherlands but also internationally:

Netherlands Honours and decorations

Grand Cross of the Order of the House of Orange (January 10, 1967)
Knight Grand Cross of the Order of the Netherlands Lion (April 29, 2004)
Wedding Medal of Princess Beatrix, and Claus von Amsberg
The Netherlands Coronation Medal 1980
Medal visiting Netherlands Antilles 1980
Royal Wedding Medal 2002
Officer's Long Service Decoration (The Netherlands), with Roman numeral XX
King Willem-Alexander Inauguration Medal 2013

Foreign honours and decorations

: Grand Cross of the Order of the Crown
: Grand Cordon of Order of Merit
: Grand Cross First class of the Order of Merit of the Federal Republic of Germany
: Grand Cross of the Order of the White Rose of Finland
: Grand Cross of the National Order of Merit
: Grand Cross of the Order of Merit of the Italian Republic
: Grand Cross of the National Order
: Grand Cordon of the Order of the Sacred Treasure
: Grand Cordon of the Supreme Order of the Renaissance
: Grand Cross of the Order of Adolphe of Nassau
: Grand Cross of the Order of the Oak Crown
: Commemorative Medal of the marriage of TRH Prince Jean and Princess Josephine-Charlotte of Luxembourg
: Grand Cross of the Royal Norwegian Order of Merit
: Commander's Cross of the Order of Merit of the Republic of Poland (2012)
: Grand Cross of the Order of Prince Henry
 Romania: Grand Cross of the Order of August 23
: Grand Cross of the National Order of the Lion
: Grand Cross of the Royal Order of Isabella the Catholic
: Grand Cordon of the Honorary Order of the Yellow Star
: Grand Cordon of the Order of the Liberator
: Commander Grand Cross of the Order of the Polar Star

Honorary citizenship
On June 12, 2004, he was made an Honorary citizen of the town of Vollenhove.

References

External links

 Professor Pieter van Vollenhoven Description and CV on the Royal House website

1939 births
Living people
Royal Netherlands Air Force pilots
Royal Netherlands Air Force officers
Dutch royalty
House of Orange-Nassau
People from Apeldoorn
People from Schiedam
Academic staff of the University of Twente
Leiden University alumni
Grand Cordons of the Honorary Order of the Yellow Star
Grand Croix of the Légion d'honneur
Commanders Grand Cross of the Order of the Polar Star
Knights Grand Cross of the Order of Isabella the Catholic
Knights Grand Cross of the Order of Merit of the Italian Republic
Grand Crosses of the Order of the Crown (Belgium)
Grand Crosses 1st class of the Order of Merit of the Federal Republic of Germany
Grand Crosses of the Order of Prince Henry
Grand Crosses of the Order of the House of Orange
Recipients of the Order of the Sacred Treasure, 1st class